"Weak" is a song by American R&B vocal trio SWV for their debut studio album, It's About Time (1992). It was written and produced by Brian Alexander Morgan, who composed the lyrics based on a young person falling in love for the first time. Morgan originally wrote the song for Charlie Wilson, but he later decided to give the song to SWV. Morgan revealed that Coko did not like the song and gave him attitude during the recording of the single.

"Weak" was released as the third single from the album, following the commercial success of "I'm So into You". It topped the US Billboard Hot 100 for two weeks in July 1993, ending the two-month-long reign of Janet Jackson's "That's the Way Love Goes". It sold over one million copies domestically and was awarded a Platinum certification from the Recording Industry Association of America (RIAA). It also topped the Billboard Hot R&B/Hip-Hop Songs chart for two weeks. Outside the US, the single reached number six on the New Zealand Singles Charts, number 33 on the UK Singles Chart, number 42 on the Canadian RPM Top Singles chart and number 94 on the Australian Singles Chart.

Billboard named the song number 72 on their list of 100 Greatest Girl Group Songs of All Time.

Critical reception
Pan-European magazine Music & Media described "Weak" as a "lush ballad".

Track listing and formats
 Germany CD maxi single
 "Weak" (R-N-B Mix) – 4:44
 "Weak" (Bam Jam Extended Jeep Mix) – 6:00
 "SMV" (In the House) – 2:58
 "I'm So into You" – 4:38

 US CD maxi single
 "Weak" (Radio Edit) – 4:21
 "Weak" (Bam Jam Jeep Mix) – 4:35
 "Weak" (R-N-B Radio Mix) – 4:39
 "Weak" (Bam Jam Extended Jeep Mix) – 4:54
 "Weak" (Down Mix) – 4:34
 "Weak" (Album Version) – 4:51

Charts

Weekly charts

Year-end charts

Decade-end charts

Certifications

See also
 R&B number-one hits of 1993 (USA)
 List of Hot 100 number-one singles of 1993 (U.S.)

References

1990s ballads
1992 songs
1993 singles
Billboard Hot 100 number-one singles
RCA Records singles
Songs written by Brian Alexander Morgan
SWV songs